William Birkmyre (1838 – 19 April 1900) was Liberal Member of Parliament (MP)  for Ayr Burghs from 1892 to 1895.

References

External links

The wealth of India and the hindrances to its increase : Being an address delivered to the members of the Manchester and Greenock Chambers of Commerce, May, 1890, by William Birkmyre
The Secretary of State for India in Council

Members of the Parliament of the United Kingdom for Scottish constituencies
Scottish Liberal Party MPs
UK MPs 1892–1895
1838 births
1900 deaths